Hades in the ancient Greek religion and myth, is the god of the dead and the king of the underworld, with which his name became synonymous.

Hades may also refer to:

Arts and entertainment

Fictional entities
 Hades (DC Comics)
 Hades (Marvel Comics)
 Hades (Disney) 
 Hades (Saint Seiya)
 Gray Waste, or Hades, a plane of existence in Dungeons and Dragons

Music
 Hades Almighty, originally Hades, a Norwegian black metal band 
 Hades (single album), by VIXX, 2016
 "Hades", a song by Kalmah from the 2000 album Swamplord
 "Hades", a song by Turmion Kätilöt from the 2008 album U.S.C.H!
 "Hades", a song by Bushido, 2018
 Hades: The Other World, a 2014 album by Yōsei Teikoku

Other uses in arts and entertainment
 Hades (film), a 1995 German drama film
 Escape Plan 2: Hades, 2018 American film
 "Hades" (Ulysses episode), in James Joyce's novel
 Hades (video game), a 2020 video game by Supergiant Games

Other uses
 Hadès, a French nuclear ballistic missile system
 Hades (horse), a New Zealand Thoroughbred racehorse
 Hades (imprint), an imprint of the former publisher Verlag Harri Deutsch
 Hades (moon), a 1955–1975 informal name for Jupiter IX, now called Sinope
 HADES (software), a signal processing system
 Hades Publications, a Canadian science fiction and fantasy publisher
 Arch Hades (born 1992), a British poet
 Lena Hades (born 1959), a Russian artist

See also

 Hade (disambiguation)
 Hades in popular culture
 Christian views on Hades